Fade (stylized as fade) was a Japanese-American rock band formed in 1991. To date, Fade has released 5 mini-albums, 3 full-length studio albums, and 2 singles. Fade is currently signed with record label Universal Music Japan. On April 9, 2014, fade announced an indefinite hiatus, in effect after the completion of their June tour.

History

Pre-Fade and Formation
The band was founded by drummer and songwriter Rui Watanabe and guitarist Kansei Miyagi, both of whom attended the same Japanese secondary school in New York City, New York. In 1994 bassist Noriyuki Hashimoto joined the group and in 1998 a second guitarist, Shingo Terasawa, (alias 5°, pronounced Godo) came on board. In 1999 the members relocated to Tokyo, Japan and in 2001, Jon Underdown, who at the time was an exchange student hailing from Seattle, Washington, joined the band solidifying the line-up. The following year, 2002, the group officially decided on the band name “Fade”. Jon, Rui and Kansei were born in the United States but only Jon doesn't have any Japanese ancestry while Noriyuki and Godo were born in Japan.

Fade and A Moment of Truth
The band's self-titled debut mini-album, fade, was released nationwide in Japan in 2003. It ranked 3rd on Japan Countdown, a weekly countdown chart of album sales nationwide in Japan. Following their debut mini-album, while working with Markku Lappalainen (ex. Hoobastank), Erik Gregory (programming for Linkin Park’s 1st remix album Reanimation), and Jason C. Miller (gODHEAD) in 2005, Fade released their second mini-album entitled A Moment of Truth. “Beautiful”, the album's 3rd track, was featured in the 2006 Shunji Iwai film, Rainbow Song.

Under the Sun and To Find A Better Tomorrow
A Moment of Truth was shortly followed by the release of Under the Sun, the band's 3rd mini-album, a few months later. The band's 4th mini-album release, To Find A Better Tomorrow, in which they worked with Ted Jensen, was released in 2008 ranking 9th on the Western Music chart of USEN Japan. The album's 6th track, “Slitting Regret”, features additional vocals from Toyo of Japanese industrial metal band Newbreed.

Age of Innocence
2009 marked Fade's 5th release and first full-length studio album, Age of Innocence. It included numerous songs that were featured on numerous marketing campaigns including ABC-Mart, and popular video games series' Drum Mania and Guitar Freaks.

Kings of Dawn
Fade's 6th release, Kings of Dawn, arrived in 2011, which featured Koie Kenta, of Japanese industrial metal band Crossfaith, on the intro track “Born Ready”. This was also the first album featuring Jon singing in Japanese in addition to being the first album which the band hired producer, Hajime Okano (L'Arc en Ciel). An ITunes version of Kings of Dawn was released which included a cover of Bon Jovi's, Livin' on a Prayer(1986). In addition, a European edition of Kings of Dawn was also released in December 2011 through Gan-shin Records.

One Reason and Cosmicalism
Concurrently, the singles "One Reason" and "Cosmicalism" (コズミカリズム Kozumikarizumu) were also released in April 2011. The song “One Reason” by Fade featuring Deadman Wonder Band (DWB), was the opening theme song to the Japanese anime Deadman Wonderland. A limited edition of “One Reason” was also released in 2011, which included a bonus DVD of the anime movie Deadman Wonderland. The song "One Reason" ranked 4th on the Independent Label music chart.

Ten
Ten (天), the band's 7th album was released in July 2012. The band once again collaborated with producer Hajime Okano, and featured Toyo from Newbreed on the album's 2nd track, "Chase for Daylight", Jon once described the concept of TEN as “ROCK with pop sensibility” and commented “I think we went to the poppyest we’ve ever been on one side, and we went to the heaviest we’ve ever been, too”. A limited-edition of TEN was also released which included a bonus DVD featuring selected live concert footage and music videos.

Crossroad ~History of fade~
The band's 8th album, released on 26 February 2014, features 17 tracks of which 3 are new. The band worked with Akira Yamaoka on new track "One Shot Dealer". Mixing for the album was done in LA by Jay Baumgardner.

Discography

Mini-Album
 Fade (Self-Titled) (1st January 2003)
1.- Metamorphosis
2.- One Day
3.- Save Me
4.- Fustration's Puppet
5.- Inner Peace

 A Moment of Truth (23th March 2005)
1.- Drifting Away
2.- Five
3.- Beautiful
4.- She
5.- From The Inside Out
6.- Wiser For The Wear

 Under the Sun (27th July 2005)
1.- Better Scarred
2.- Under The Sun
3.- Nature Of Rain
4.- Out Body Of Experience
5.- You

 To Find A Better Tomorrow (6th August 2008)
1.- Filter
2.- Break Away
3.- Miss You
4.- Till The End Of Time
5.- Fool
6.- Slitting Regret
7.- The Sound Of Light

 Kings of Dawn (4th April 2011)

1.- Born Ready
2.- Cosmicalism (コズミカリズム)
3.- Black Hearts & Doller $ign$
4.- Tides OF Change
5.- Kings Of Dawn
6.- Livin' On A Prayer
7.- Relax
8.- Face (Acoustic)

Studio albums
 Age Of Innocence (11th November 2009)
1.- Last Man Standing
2.- So Far Gone
3.- Reflection
4.- Let It Go
5.- The Age Of Innocence
6.- Trapped
7.- Reality Lost
8.- Face
9.- Spin
10.- It Was You

 Ten (6th Jun 2012)
1.- In The End
2.- Chase for Daylight (Feat. Toyo)
3.- Reimei ~黎明~
4.- Ever Free
5.- Close to You (Jp)
6.- Moment of Life
7.- Keep the Faith
8.- WAKE UP THE WORLD
10.- Million to One
11.- Always and Forever
12.- Ten
13.- Beautiful (Ver. 2012)
14.- Close to You (Eng)

EP's
 Crossroad History Of Fade (26th Feb 2014)
1.- Crossroad
2.- Yurenonaka (ユレノナカ)
3.- One Shot Dealer

Singles
 Black Hearts And Dollar Signs (2009)
 One Reason (2011)
 From The Heart (2011)
 Cosmicalism (2011)
 Cross Road (2013)

Band members
 Jonathan Mathew "Jon" Underdown − lead vocals 
 Shingo "Godo" Terasawa − guitars, backing vocals 
 Noriyuki Hashimoto − bass, backing vocals 
 Kansei Miyagi − guitars, backing vocals 
 Rui Watanabe − drums, bandleader

References

External links 
 

Japanese rock music groups
American rock music groups
Musical groups established in 1991
Universal Music Japan artists
Musical groups from New York City
Musical groups from Tokyo
1991 establishments in New York City
2001 establishments in Japan
English-language musical groups from Japan